Dactylotula kinkerella is a moth of the family Gelechiidae. It is found from Sweden to the Pyrenees and Alps, and from the Netherlands to Ukraine. It is also found in Croatia and Russia (the southern Ural). The habitat consists of sandy areas.

The wingspan is 9–13 mm.

The larvae feed on Ammophila arenaria. They mine the leaves of their host plant. The mine has the form of a yellowish, upper-surface inflated blotch. The larva hibernates in the mine and pupation takes place inside the mine in spring. Larvae can be found from September to May.

References

Moths described in 1876
Apatetrini
Moths of Europe